Joseph Frank Pearson (19 September 1877 – 1946) was a football player in the early years of professional football in England. Pearson played for Aston Villa from Aug. 1900 - May 1908. Before playing for Villa, he played for Saltley College FC.

External links
 Joe Pearson's Bio at Aston Villa Player Database

1877 births
1946 deaths
Aston Villa F.C. players
Association football midfielders
English footballers
FA Cup Final players